Deep Narayan Singh  was an Indian politician, participant in the Indian independence movement, and a former Chief Minister of Bihar.

Born in Purantand, Bihar, Singh was a Member of the Constituent Assembly of India which was elected to write the Constitution of India. He also served as part of India's first Parliament as an independent nation and was a Member of the Bihar Legislative Assembly. He was associated with the triumvirate of nationalists Rajendra Babu, Anugraha Babu and Shri babu. He succeeded Krishna Singh as the Chief Minister of Bihar.

In 1979, a museum was established in his honour by the Directorate of Archaeology and Museum in Hajipur, Bihar.

References

1894 births
1977 deaths
Chief Ministers of Bihar
Indian National Congress politicians from Bihar
People from Vaishali district
Indian independence activists from Bihar
Finance Ministers of Bihar
Members of the Constituent Assembly of India
Bihar MLAs 1957–1962
Chief ministers from Indian National Congress